MVP is the debut novel of writer James Boice. It follows the life story of Gilbert Marcus, a star basketball player who rapes and kills a woman in a hotel room during the off-season. The prologue was featured in Esquire Magazine in September 2006. Publishers Weekly described it as a "stunning debut."

References

External links 
 Official web site

2007 American novels
Novels about rape
American sports novels
Basketball books
2007 debut novels